The West African crested tern (Thalasseus albididorsalis) is a bird species in the family Laridae. Until 2020 it was considered a subspecies of the New World royal tern, Thalasseus maximus.

Taxonomy and systematics

The West African crested tern was long thought to be a subspecies of royal tern. A study published in 2005 showed that it is more closely related to the lesser crested tern (Thalasseus bengalensis). A 2017 publication expanded on those results. In the summer of 2020 the American Ornithological Society and International Ornithological Committee accepted it as a full species.

Description

The West African crested tern is among the largest of the crested terns. Its tail is forked and the adult's bill is long and orange. In breeding plumage its underside is white and upper parts pale gray; the top of the head is black with a shaggy crest at the rear. The primary feathers are tipped with black. The adult's legs are black. The non-breeding adult plumage is similar except that the black on the head is confined to the crest. Juveniles have variable plumage. The underside is white and the upper parts streaked and blotched. The bill is smaller and pale yellow; the legs are seldom black but can be green, yellow, or pink.

Distribution

The West African crested tern is known to breed only on a few islands off the coast of Africa between Mauritania and Senegambia, though it is suspected to also breed as far east as Nigeria. In the non-breeding season it can be found along the coast from Morocco to Namibia.

Diet

Like all Thalasseus terns, the West African crested tern feeds by plunge-diving for fish and shrimp, usually in shallow coastal and tidal waters. It usually dives directly, and not from the "stepped-hover" favored by Arctic tern. Its known foods include members of the herring family, mullet, grunts, jacks, and spadefish.

Status
The IUCN has not evaluated the West African crested tern's status.

References 

West African crested tern
Birds of West Africa
West African crested tern